Guatemala City, officially New Guatemala of Assumption, known locally as Guate, is the capital and largest city of Guatemala, and the most populous urban area in Central America. The city is located in the south-central part of the country, nestled in a mountain valley called Valle de la Ermita. The city is the capital of the Municipality of Guatemala and of the Guatemala Department.

Guatemala City is the site of the Mayan city of Kaminaljuyu, founded around 1500 BC. Following the Spanish conquest, a new town was established, and in 1776 it was made capital of the Kingdom of Guatemala. In 1821, Guatemala City was the scene of the declaration of independence of Central America from Spain, after which it became the capital of the newly established United Provinces of Central America (later the Federal Republic of Central America).

In 1847, Guatemala declared itself an independent republic, with Guatemala City as its capital. The city was originally located in what is now Antigua Guatemala, and was moved to its current location in 1777.

Guatemala City and the original location in Antigua Guatemala were almost completely destroyed by the 1917–18 earthquakes. Reconstructions following the earthquakes have resulted in a more modern architectural landscape. Today, Guatemala City is the political, cultural, and economic center of Guatemala.

History

Early history

Human settlement on the present site of Guatemala City began with the Maya, who built a large ceremonial center at Kaminaljuyu. This large Maya settlement, the biggest outside the Maya lowlands in the Yucatan Peninsula, rose to prominence around 300 BC due to an increase in mining and trading of obsidian, a valuable commodity for the pre-Columbian civilizations in Mesoamerica. Kaminaljuyu then collapsed around 300 AD for unknown causes. 

During the Spanish conquest of Guatemala, settlers coming after the conquistador Pedro de Alvarado established a small town about 1 km south of the old ruins of Kaminaljuyu. This small town was made the capital city of the Captaincy General of Guatemala by the Spanish royal authorities in 1775 after a series of devastating earthquakes had left the old capital city, Antigua Guatemala, in ruins and unusable to the Spanish colonial authorities. During this period the central plaza, with the Cathedral of Guatemala City and the Palace of the Captain-General, were constructed. After Central American independence from Spain the city became the capital of the United Provinces of Central America in 1821.

The 19th century saw the construction of the monumental Carrera Theater in the 1850s, and the modern-day Presidential Palace in the 1890s. At this time the city was expanding around the 30 de Junio Boulevard and elsewhere, displacing native settlements on the peripheries of the growing city. Earthquakes in 1917–1918 destroyed many historic structures. Under President Jorge Ubico in the 1930s a hippodrome and many new public buildings were constructed, although slums that had formed after the 1917–1918 earthquakes continued to lack basic amenities.

During the Guatemalan Civil War, terror attacks beginning with the burning of the Spanish Embassy in 1980 led to widespread political repression and loss of life in the city. Guatemala City continues to be subject to natural disasters, with the latest being the two disasters that struck in May 2010: the eruption of the Pacaya volcano and, two days later, the torrential downpours from Tropical Storm Agatha.

Contemporary history

Guatemala City serves as the economic, governmental, and cultural epicenter of the nation of Guatemala. The city also functions as Guatemala's main transportation hub, hosting an international airport, La Aurora International Airport, and serving as the origination or end points for most of Guatemala's major highways. The city, with its robust economy, attracts hundreds of thousands of rural migrants from Guatemala's interior hinterlands and serves as the main entry point for most foreign immigrants seeking to settle in Guatemala.

In addition to a wide variety of restaurants, hotels, shops, and a modern BRT transport system (Transmetro), the city is home to many art galleries, theaters, sports venues and museums (including some fine collections of Pre-Columbian art) and provides a growing number of cultural offerings. Guatemala City not only possesses a history and culture unique to the Central American region, it also furnishes all the modern amenities of a world class city, ranging from an IMAX Theater to the Ícaro film festival (Festival Ícaro), where independent films produced in Guatemala and Central America are debuted.

Structure and growth

 

Guatemala City is located in the mountainous regions of the country, between the Pacific coastal plain to the south and the northern lowlands of the Peten region.

The city's metropolitan area has recently grown very rapidly and has absorbed most of the neighboring municipalities of Villa Nueva, San Miguel Petapa, Mixco, San Juan Sacatepequez, San José Pinula, Santa Catarina Pinula, Fraijanes, San Pedro Ayampuc, Amatitlán, Villa Canales, Palencia and Chinautla forming what is now known as the Guatemala City Metropolitan Area.

The city is subdivided into 22 zones ("Zonas") designed by the urban engineering of Raúl Aguilar Batres, each one with its own streets ("Calles"). avenues ("Avenidas") and sometimes "Diagonal" Streets, making it pretty easy to find addresses in the city. Zones are numbered 1–25 with Zones 20, 22 and 23 not existing as they would have fallen in two other municipalities' territory. Addresses are assigned according to the street or avenue number, followed by a dash and the number of metres it is away from the intersection.

For example, the INGUAT Office on "7a Av. 1-17, Zona 4" is a building which is located on Avenida 7, 17 meters away from the intersection with Calle 1, toward Calle 2 in zone 4.

7a Av. 1-17, Zona 4; and 7a Av. 1-17, Zona 10, are two radically different addresses.

Short streets/avenues do not get new sequenced number, for example, 6A Calle is a short street between 6a and 7a.

Some "avenidas" or "Calles" have a name in addition to their number, if it is very wide, for example Avenida la Reforma is an avenue which separates Zone 9 and 10 and Calle Montúfar is Calle 12 in Zone 9.

Calle 1 Avenida 1 Zona 1 is the center of every city in Guatemala.

Zone One is the Historic Center, (Centro Histórico), lying in the very heart of the city, the location of many important historic buildings including the Palacio Nacional de la Cultura (National Palace of Culture), the Metropolitan Cathedral, the National Congress, the Casa Presidencial (Presidential House), the National Library and Plaza de la Constitución (Constitution Plaza, old Central Park). Efforts to revitalize this important part of the city have been undertaken by the municipal government.

Besides the parks, the city offers a portfolio of entertainment in the region, focused on the so-called Zona Viva and the Calzada Roosevelt as well as four degrees North. Casino activity is considerable, with several located in different parts of the Zona Viva. The area around the East market is being redeveloped.

Within the financial district are the tallest buildings in the country including: Club Premier, Tinttorento, Atlantis building, Atrium, Tikal Futura, Building of Finances, Towers Building Batteries, Torres Botticelli, Tadeus, building of the INTECAP, Royal Towers, Towers Geminis, Industrial Bank towers, Holiday Inn Hotel, Premier of the Americas, among many others to be used for offices, apartments etc. Also included are projects such as Zona Pradera and Interamerica's World Financial Center.

One of the most outstanding mayors was the engineer Martin Prado Vélez, who took over in 1949, and ruled the city during the reformist Presidents Juan José Arévalo and Jacobo Arbenz Guzman, although he was not a member of the ruling party at the time and was elected due his well-known capabilities. Of cobanero origin, married with Marta Cobos, he studied at the University of San Carlos; under his tenure, among other modernist works of the city, infrastructure projects included El Incienso bridge, the construction of the Roosevelt Avenue, the main road axis from East to West of the city, the town hall building, and numerous road works which meant the widening of the colonial city, its order in the cardinal points and the generation of a ring road with the first cloverleaf interchange in the city.

In an attempt to control the rapid growth of the city, the municipal government (Municipalidad de Guatemala) headed by longtime Mayor Álvaro Arzú, has implemented a plan to focus growth along important arterial roads and apply Transit-oriented development (TOD) characteristics. This plan denominated POT (Plan de Ordenamiento Territorial) aims to allow taller building structures of mixed uses to be built next to large arterial roads and gradually decline in height and density moving away from such. It is also worth mentioning, that due to the airport being in the south of the city, height limits based on aeronautical considerations have been applied to the construction code.

Climate
Despite its location in the tropics, Guatemala City has a tropical savanna climate (Köppen Aw) bordering humid subtropical climate (Cwa), due to its relatively high altitude which moderate the average temperatures. Guatemala City is generally very warm, almost springlike, throughout the course of the year. 

It occasionally gets hot during the dry season, but not as hot and humid as in Central American cities at sea level. The hottest month is April. The rainy season extends from May to October, coinciding with the tropical storm and hurricane season in the western Atlantic Ocean and Caribbean Sea, while the dry season extends from November to April. The city can at times be windy, which also leads to lower ambient temperatures.

Volcanic activity
Four stratovolcanoes are visible from the city, two of them active. The nearest and most active is Pacaya, which at times erupts a considerable amount of ash. These volcanoes lie to the south of the Valle de la Ermita, providing a natural barrier between Guatemala City and the Pacific lowlands that define the southern regions of Guatemala. Agua, Fuego, Pacaya and Acatenango comprise a line of 33 stratovolcanoes that stretches across the breadth of Guatemala, from the Salvadorian border to the Mexican border.

Earthquakes

Lying on the Ring of Fire, the Guatemalan highlands and the Valle de la Ermita are frequently shaken by large earthquakes. The last large tremor to hit the Guatemala City region occurred in the 1976, on the Motagua Fault, a left-lateral strike-slip fault that forms the boundary between the Caribbean Plate and the North American Plate. The 1976 event registered 7.5 on the moment magnitude scale. Smaller, less severe tremors are frequently felt in Guatemala City and environs.

Mudslides
Torrential downpours, similar to the more famous monsoons, occur frequently in the Valle de la Ermita during the rainy season, leading to flash floods that sometimes inundate the city. Due to these heavy rainfalls, some of the slums perched on the steep edges of the canyons that criss-cross the Valle de la Ermita are washed away and buried under mudslides, as in October 2005. Tropical waves, tropical storms and hurricanes sometimes strike the Guatemalan highlands, which also bring torrential rains to the Guatemala City region and trigger these deadly mudslides.

Piping pseudokarst

In February 2007, a very large, deep circular hole with vertical walls opened in northeastern Guatemala City, killing five people. As a result, one thousand people were evacuated from the area. This piping feature has since been mitigated by City Hall by providing proper maintenance to the sewerage collection system and plans to develop the site have been proposed. However, critics believe municipal authorities have neglected needed maintenance on the city's aging sewerage system, and have speculated that more dangerous piping features are likely to develop unless action is taken.

3 years later the 2010 Guatemala City sinkhole arose.

Demographics

It is estimated that the population of Guatemala City proper is about 1 million, while its urban area is almost 3 million. The growth of the city's population has been robust, abetted by the mass migration of Guatemalans from the rural hinterlands to the largest and most vibrant regional economy in Guatemala. The inhabitants of Guatemala City are incredibly diverse given the size of the city, with those of Spanish and Mestizo descent being the most numerous. Guatemala City also has sizable indigenous populations, divided among the 23 distinct Mayan groups present in Guatemala. The numerous Mayan languages are now spoken in certain quarters of Guatemala City, making the city a linguistically rich area. Foreigners and foreign immigrants comprise the final distinct group of Guatemala City inhabitants, representing a very small minority among the city's denizens.

Due to mass migration from impoverished rural districts wracked with political instability, Guatemala City's population has exploded since the 1970s, severely straining the existing bureaucratic and physical infrastructure of the city. As a result, chronic traffic congestion, shortages of safe potable water in some areas of the city, and a sudden and prolonged surge in crime have become perennial problems. The infrastructure, although continuing to grow and improve in some areas, is lagging in relation to the increasing population of rural migrants, who tend to be poorer.

Communications
Guatemala City is headquarters to many communications and telecom companies, among them Tigo, Claro-Telgua, and Movistar-Telefónica. These companies also offer cable television, internet services and telephone access. Due to Guatemala City's large and concentrated consumer base in comparison to the rest of the country, these telecom and communications companies provide most of their services and offerings within the confines of the city. There are also seven local television channels, in addition to numerous international channels. The international channels range from children's programming, like Nickelodeon and the Disney Channel, to more adult offerings, such as E! and HBO. While international programming is dominated by entertainment from the United States, domestic programming is dominated by shows from Mexico. Due to its small and relatively income-restricted domestic market, Guatemala City produces very little in the way of its own programming outside of local news and sports.

Economy and Finance
Guatemala City, as the capital, is home to Guatemala's central bank, from which Guatemala's monetary and fiscal policies are formulated and promulgated. Guatemala City is also headquarters to numerous regional private banks, among them CitiBank, Banco Agromercantil, Banco Promerica, Banco Industrial, Banco GyT Continental, Banco de Antigua, Banco Reformador, Banrural, Grupo Financiero de Occidente, BAC Credomatic, and Banco Internacional.

By far the richest and most powerful regional economy within Guatemala, Guatemala City is the largest market for goods and services, which provides the greatest number of investment opportunities for public and private investors in all of Guatemala. Financing for these investments is provided by the regional private banks, as well as through foreign direct investment mostly coming from the United States. Guatemala City's ample consumer base and service sector is represented by the large department store chains present in the city, among them Siman, Hiper Paiz & Paiz (Walmart), Price Smart, ClubCo, Cemaco, Sears and Office Depot.

Places of interest by zones

Guatemala City is divided into 22 zones in accordance with the urban layout plan designed by Raúl Aguilar Batres. Each zone has its own streets and avenues, facilitating navigation within the city. Zones are numbered 1 through 25.  However, numbers 20, 22 and 23 have not been designated to zones, thus these zones do not exist within the city proper.

Transportation

Renovated and expanded, La Aurora International Airport lies to the south of the city center. La Aurora serves as Guatemala's principal air hub.
Public transport is provided by buses and supplemented by a BRT system. The three main highways that bisect and serve Guatemala start in the city. (CA9 Transoceanic Highway - Puerto San Jose to Puerto Santo Tomas de Castilla-, CA1 Panamerican Highway - from the Mexican border to Salvadorian border - and to Peten.) Construction of freeways and underpasses by the municipal government, the implementation of reversible lanes during peak rush-hour traffic, as well as the establishment of the Department of Metropolitan Transit Police (PMT), has helped improve traffic flow in the city. Despite these municipal efforts, the Guatemala City metropolitan area still faces growing traffic congestion.
A BRT (bus rapid transit) system called Transmetro, consisting of special-purpose lanes for high-capacity buses, began operating in 2007, and aimed to improve traffic flow in the city through the implementation of an efficient mass transit system. The system consists of five lines. It is expected to be expanded around 10 lines, with some over-capacity expected lines being considered for Light Metro or Heavy Metro.

Traditional buses are now required to discharge passengers at transfer stations at the city's edge to board the Transmetro. This is being implemented as new Transmetro lines become established. In conjunction with the new mass transit implementation in the city, there is also a prepaid bus card system called Transurbano that is being implemented in the metro area to limit cash handling for the transportation system. A new fleet of buses tailored for this system has been purchased from a Brazilian firm.

A light rail line known as Metro Riel is proposed.

Universities and schools

Guatemala City is home to ten universities, among them the oldest institution of higher education in Central America, the University of San Carlos of Guatemala.  Founded in 1676, the Universidad de San Carlos is older than all North American universities except for Harvard University.

The other nine institutions of higher education to be found in Guatemala City include the Universidad Mariano Gálvez, the Universidad Panamericana, the Universidad Mesoamericana, the Universidad Rafael Landivar, the Universidad Francisco Marroquín, the Universidad del Valle, the Universidad del Istmo, Universidad Galileo, Universidad da Vinci and the Universidad Rural.  Whereas these nine named universities are private, the Universidad de San Carlos remains the only public institution of higher learning.

Sports
Guatemala City possesses several sportsgrounds and is home to many sports clubs. Football is the most popular sport, with CSD Municipal, Aurora F.C. and Comunicaciones being the main clubs.

The Estadio Doroteo Guamuch Flores, located in the Zone 5 of the city, is the largest stadium in the country, followed in capacity by the Estadio Cementos Progreso, Estadio del Ejército & Estadio El Trébol. An important multi-functional hall is the Domo Polideportivo de la CDAG.

The city has hosted several promotional functions and some international sports events: in 1950 it hosted the VI Central American and Caribbean Games, and in 2000 the FIFA Futsal World Championship. On 4 July 2007 the International Olympic Committee gathered in Guatemala City and voted Sochi to become the host for the 2014 Winter Olympics and Paralympics. In April 2010, it hosted the XIVth Pan-American Mountain Bike Championships.

Guatemala City hosted the 2008 edition of the CONCACAF Futsal Championship, played at the Domo Polideportivo from 2 to 8 June 2008.

Panoramic views of Guatemala City

1875

2020

International relations

International organizations with headquarters in Guatemala City
 Central American Parliament

Twin towns – sister cities
Guatemala City is twinned with:

Notable residents

Raúl Aguilar Batres, engineer, creator of Guatemala City's system of avenue/street notation
María Dolores Bedoya, Central American independence activist
Alejandro Giammattei, President of Guatemala
Álvaro Arzú, President of Guatemala and six times mayor of Guatemala City
Miguel Ángel Asturias, writer and diplomat, Nobel Prize Laureate
Ricardo Arjona, singer /songwriter
Manuel Colom Argueta, former mayor of Guatemala City and politician
Toti Fernández, triathlete and ultramarathon runner
Juan José Gutiérrez, CEO of Pollo Campero and on the board of directors of Corporación Multi Inversiones. Has been featured on the cover of Newsweek as Super CEO and named one of the Ten Big Thinkers for Big Business.
Ted Hendricks, Oakland Raiders NFL Hall Of Fame Linebacker. 4-time Super Bowl Champion
Jorge de León, performance artist
Zipacná de León (1948–2002), painter
Carlos Mérida, painter
Jimmy Morales, Former President of Guatemala
Gaby Moreno, singer/ songwriter
Carlos Peña, singer, winner of Latin American Idol 2007
Luis Oliva, actor, singer and director
Georgina Pontaza, actress and artistic director of the Teatro Abril and Teatro Fantasía 
Fernando Quevedo, theoretical physicist, professor of High Energy Physics at the University of Cambridge
Rodolfo Robles, physician, discovered onchocercosis "Robles' Disease"
Fabiola Rodas, winner of The Third TV Azteca's Desafio de Estrellas 2nd Place in The Last Generation of La Academia
Gabriela Asturias Ruiz, neuroscientist
Carlos Ruíz, football/soccer player
Shery, singer / songwriter
Jaime Viñals, mountaineer (scaled seven highest peaks in the world)
Luis von Ahn, computer scientist, founder of Duolingo, CAPTCHA's creator and Researcher at Carnegie Mellon University
Rodrigo Saravia, Guatemala national team footballer
Sergio Custodio, professor and writer in logic and metaphysics
Ricardo Cerna, a Guatemala-American suspect who somehow committed suicide inside a police station in the US

See also
 List of places in Guatemala

Notes and references

References

Bibliography

External links

 
 
 Official Website of the Municipalidad de Guatemala 

 
Municipalities of the Guatemala Department
Capitals in Central America
Capitals in North America
Populated places established in 1773